Gohar Nabil (born January 31, 1973) is an Egyptian handball player. He competed for Egypt's national team at the 1992, 1996, 2000 Summer Olympics.

References 

1973 births
Living people
Egyptian male handball players
Olympic handball players of Egypt
Handball players at the 1992 Summer Olympics
Handball players at the 1996 Summer Olympics
Handball players at the 2000 Summer Olympics